Anne Logston (born February 15, 1962) is an American author of fantasy/adventure novels.

She was born in Indiana and attended the University of Indianapolis, where she received an associate degree in computer science and a B.A. in English. She worked as a legal secretary.

Works

Shadow series
These are about the "elvan" thief named Shadow, and her niece Jael.

Other novels
 
 

Exile is a direct sequel to Guardian's Key, following the life of the original protagonist's daughter.

References

External links 
 Official website
 Bibliography at SciFan
 

1962 births
Living people
20th-century American novelists
American fantasy writers
American women novelists
Women science fiction and fantasy writers
20th-century American women writers
21st-century American women